Tetracarbon dioxide is an oxide of carbon, a chemical compound of carbon and oxygen, with chemical formula C4O2 or O=C=C=C=C=O. It can be regarded as butatriene dione, the double ketone of butatriene — more precisely 1,2,3-butatriene-1,4-dione.

Butatriene dione is the fourth member of the family of linear carbon dioxides O(=C)n=O, that includes carbon dioxide CO2 or O=C=O,  ethylene dione C2O2 or O=C=C=O, carbon suboxide C3O2 or O=C=C=C=O, pentacarbon dioxide C5O2 or O=C=C=C=C=C=O, and so on.

The compound was obtained in 1990 by Maier and others, by flash vacuum pyrolysis of cyclic azaketones in a frozen argon matrix. It was also obtained in the same year by Sülzle and Schwartz through impact ionization of ((CH3-)2(C4O2)(=O)2=)2 in the gas phase. Although theoretical studies indicated that the even-numbered members of the  O(=C)n=O family should be inherently unstable,  C4O2 is indefinitely stable in the matrix, but is decomposed by light into tricarbon monoxide C3O and carbon monoxide CO. It has a triplet ground state.

References

 François Diederich and Yves Rubin (2003), Synthetic Approaches toward Molecular and Polymeric Carbon Allotropes. Angewandte Chemie International Edition, Volume 31 Issue 9, Pages 1101–1123.

Oxocarbons
Enones
Ketenes
Diketones
Substances discovered in the 1990s